Karakhela or Kara khel  is a village about kilometre from West of Parachinar City and about 10 kilometers to the East Pak Afghan Border, the famous Durand Line. According to the Census of Pakistan, 2017 Village List Karakhela has 3,934 personal population with 389 houses. The District Kurram was known as Kurram Agency, Federally Administered Tribal Area Pakistan.  The Famous Shalozan is on north and Nastikot village is in South.Popular native plant is Elaeagnus angustifolia commonly known as silver berry or Russian olives(Sinzalay). Karakhela used to have a gross production of Artemisia kurramensis(Tharkha). Which is a medicinal plant broadly used in medicine. Literacy rate is inclining now. Village Karakhela have produced several Engineers, Army officers and few doctors as well. Pure drinking water is a problem in whole district kurram but village Karakhela is suffering far worse since ages. Government really need to focus on this village.

Shafique Ahmed Turi, blogger from Parachinar kurram agency and Social Media Activist also belongs to village Karakhela. Ahmed Turi is son of Maulana Yousuf Hussain Kashfi famous Maulana in the Area.

References

Populated places in Kurram District